Cypridodella is an extinct genus of conodonts.

The Alaunian, a sub-age also known as "Middle Norian", in the Upper Triassic, begins with the first appearance of the ammonites Drepanites rutherfordi and Cyrtopleuritis bicrenatus and with the conodont Cypridodella multidentata. The stage ends with the first appearance of the ammonites Gnomohalorites cordilleranus and Sagenites quinquepunctatus and the conodont Cypridodella bidentata.

References 

 Two new genera Comperniodontella n. gen. and Galeodontella n. gen., and new multielement of Chirodella Hirschmann, 1959 and Cypridodella Mosher, 1968 (Conodonta) from the Mamonia Complex (Upper Triassic), Cyprus. Christopher C. Ryley and Lars E. Fahraeus, Neues Jahrbuch fuer Geologie und Palaeontologie Abhandlungen, 1994, volume 1931, pages 21–54

External links 

 
 

Conodont genera
Triassic conodonts